Classic Organizations is a supplement published by Hero Games/Iron Crown Enterprises (I.C.E.) in 1991 for the superhero role-playing game Champions.

Contents
Classic Organizations is a compilation of updated information about five organizations in the Champions universe derived from previously published material,  including DEMON, CLOWN (Criminal Legion of Wacky Nonconformists), and Red Doom.

There are also 60 new heroes and villains, and 35 scenarios.

Reception
In the September 1992 edition of Dragon (Issue 185), Allen Varney gave the book "high marks for creativity." He gave the writers "brownie points for valiantly trying to
update Red Doom, the Soviet super group, for the post-Cold War world" but pointed out that the then-recent dissolution of the Soviet Union made their efforts obsolete again. However, Swan concluded with a strong recommendation, saying, "Classic Organizations provides enough material to sate the most voracious campaign."

Reviews
White Wolf #30 (Feb., 1992)

References

Champions (role-playing game) supplements
Role-playing game supplements introduced in 1991